Mr Gay Ireland is an annual contest for gay men, with regional heats held in gay venues around Ireland, with a grand final held in late October. In previous years the final has been held in The George, Dublin. The current title holder is Max Krzyzanowski. Max won the title of Mr. Gay Ireland 2010 and went on to win the title of Mr Gay World 2010.

Founded in 2005 and originally called Mr Gay Dublin, the event is organised by the Dublin Gay Theatre Festival. Mr Gay Ireland has become more than a beauty contest and has become a nationwide community civic and social project designed to overcome negative stereotypes of gay people and to encourage a civic and social action for HIV/AIDS amongst the contestants and their friends.

The contest previously has been hosted by Brendan Courtney, alongside Dolly Grip (Drag Queen), one of the George's resident drag queens and cohost of Shirley Temple Bar's Sunday Night Bingo.

Mr Gay Ireland is run by a group of volunteers from the International Dublin Gay Theatre Festival, a registered, not for profit company, limited by guarantee. Since its inception, Mr Gay Ireland has donated almost €50,000 to charitable causes including Round Tower Housing Association (HIV/AIDS), St. James's Hospital Foundation (HIV/AIDS), BelongTo Youth Development, the KAL case and GCN.

Mr Gay Ireland 2008 Barry Meegan made the Grand Final in the Mr Gay International Competition in Hollywood in January. Both he and Mr Gay Northern Ireland  represented Ireland in the Mr Europe Competition in Budapest July 1–6. Mr Gay Ireland 2007 John Rice was 3rd in Budapest in 2007. Mikey Robinson, Mr Gay Northern Ireland 2007 made the top 8 in Budapest (‘07), following Mr Gay Ireland 2006 Keith Kearney's second place in Mr Gay Europe in Amsterdam in 2006.  
It is the only all-Ireland event of its kind. Entrants are diverse: aged from 18 to 40, with many nationalities competing for the prize. Mr Gay Dublin ‘07 was Spanish and Mr Gay South West ‘08 is Polish.

References

External links 
 Official event website

LGBT beauty pageants
LGBT events in Ireland
Beauty pageants in Ireland
Recurring events established in 2005
2005 establishments in Ireland
Male beauty pageants
Annual events in Ireland
Irish awards
Autumn events in the Republic of Ireland
Mr Gay World